Página 12 (sometimes stylised as Pagina/12, Pagina|12 or Pagina12) is a newspaper published in Buenos Aires, Argentina. It was founded on 25 May 1987 by journalist Jorge Lanata and writers Osvaldo Soriano and Alberto Elizalde Leal. Since 2016 the newspaper is property of Grupo Octubre, a multimedia company created by Víctor Santa María, president of the Justicialist Party in the Buenos Aires.

His first president was businessman Fernando Sokolowicz, in 1994 Grupo Clarín supposedly owned a share; Lanata claimed in a 2007 interview that businessman Rudy Ulloa (a businessman close to former President Néstor Kirchner) also owned a share.

The publishers also distribute a supplement covering Rosario area news, Rosario 12, since 1991.

According to in house surveys, 58% of the newspaper readership is between 18 and 52 years old and belong to the medium and medium high socio economic groups: AB and C1/C2

History

The name of the paper comes from the fact that its preliminary editions as it was being developed had 12 pages. The name had already been chosen, thus the publishers opted to reserve the twelfth page for reports or news stories of central importance. Another version holds that the paper was going to be called "Reporter" but when the owners went to register the name, they were told that the name was taken. They then decided to count the number of pages in order to choose a name.

With a stark design, a daily circulation of 10,000 copies and a size of 16 pages that doubled within a few weeks, the paper was a sharp contrast with other Argentinian newspapers due to its progressive orientation, its in-depth articles (each one occupying more than a page on average) and rich analysis. Inspired by the French paper Libération, its style contrasted with the conventional Argentine press, where a higher priority was placed on showcasing a wide variety of information as opposed to more probing reports.

The editorial staff included journalists such as Horacio Verbitsky, writers Tomás Eloy Martínez, Osvaldo Soriano and José María Pasquini Durán, Juan Gelman, Eduardo Galeano, Osvaldo Bayer, Rodrigo Fresán, Alan Pauls, Juan Forn, Eduardo Berti, Ernesto Tenembaum, Homero Alsina Thevenet, José Pablo Feinmann, Juan Sasturain Miguel Repiso (Rep) who since the release of first edition has been in charge of illustrating the back cover and various sections of the paper, have been regular contributors. The first manager was Jorge Lanata, later replaced by Ernesto Tiffenberg.

The newspaper had a close relation with the governments of Néstor and Cristina Kirchner, and received huge amounts of state advertising as a result. Cristina Kirchner made a speech during the 25th anniversary of the foundation of the newspaper in 2012, praising the editorial line, journalists and authorities. She said that "there is a true cultural battle. We'll keep fighting in all fields, and Página 12 too. They will only defeat us when we cease to fight". She made reference to a conspiracy theory, frequent in the Relato K, that considers that the Kirchners were attacked by a cabal of hegemonic groups.

Mauricio Macri was elected president in 2015, ending the Kirchnerite regime, and the advertising scheme that benefited Página 12. The newspaper had to seek private advertising as a result. The newspaper was also bought by Víctor Santa María, president of the Justicialist Party in the Buenos Aires city, and president of the Suterh union. Santa María had used the union funding to start the "Octubre" group, which also includes the newspaper Diario Z, the magazines Caras y Caretas and Planeta urbano and two radios.

Editorial stance
Página 12 is a Kirchnerist newspaper. 

The owner Víctor Santa María considers that, although it is not a complete advocate of the Kirchners, the newspaper supports most of their policies. In turn, it was also against the policies of the president Mauricio Macri. Santa María considers that media independence and journalistic objectivity do not exist.

It is one of the most popular newspapers in Argentina, being the fourth most visited portal in the news area. Since its founding, it was an alternative newspaper that sought to be progressive and analytical. It can be defined as a dissident and leftist newspaper.

Beyond presenting the news, the objective of Page 12 was to know them in depth and analyze them. It has a very strong commitment to society and has revealed various scandals at the time. It has maintained a critical stance against the government and corruption, which has resulted in the awarding of awards for his fight for the right of expression.

Controversies

When Julio Nudler, who was the head of the economic department of Página 12, impeached the chief of the Kirchner cabinet with corruption allegations in 2004 the directorate of Página 12 refused to publish an article of Nudler. Nudler accused Página 12 of censorship and the article was finally published, with an added note from his colleague Horacio Verbitsky stating that some of the data in the article was wrong.

The government of the Kirchners favored Página 12 with a huge portion of the advertising media selection. State advertising was destined to media politically aligned to the Kirchners, instead of to the most sold ones; this was used as a reward to such media for their political support. The Kirchner administration ceased to release full numbers of this operation in 2009. As of 2010, the partial numbers released revealed that Página 12 received 33.9 million pesos, 26.5% of the total advertising. The media of Sergio Szpolski, also a vocal supporter to the Kirchners, got 21% of the total, and both of them combined received the 47.5% of all the advertising. In contrast, Clarín, the highest sold newspaper, only got 12.9 million, 10% of the total advertising. Mauricio Macri was elected president in 2015, and redefined the advertising scheme. Página 12 received 3.2 million in 2017 under the new scheme. Víctor Santa María considers that this is a campaign of defamation by a cabal of hegemonic groups, and that the freedom of the press is in danger. He was supported by a number of former populist Latin American presidents, who wrote a manifesto against the perceived censorship against Página 12. In 2009, Página 12 stridently defended a group of anarchists who attacked marchers in a parade in Buenos Aires celebrating Israel's Independence Day, claiming that the anarchists were innocent and had themselves been attacked by a "secret group speaking Hebrew"; Osvaldo Bayer and other intellectuals wrote an open letter in the paper calling on Israel's Ambassador to Argentina to drop the charges against the anarchists in the name of world peace, which made no sense because the charges were filed by the local Argentine government and the Israeli Ambassador wasn't involved in any of the events related to it. Several of the anarchists ended up being convicted of assault and disorderly conduct and served prison terms.

When Jorge Bergoglio was elected as Pope Francis, Página 12 published renewed allegations about his actions during the Dirty War. However, due to the Pope's popularity in Argentina, Cristina Kirchner made what the political analyst Claudio Fantini called a "Copernican shift" in her relations with him and fully embraced the Francis phenomenon. Página 12 then removed their controversial articles about Bergoglio, written by Horacio Verbitsky, from their web page, as a result of this change.

A 2012 comic strip titled "An Adventure of David Gueto" featured a parody of a DJ, asking the prisoners of a Nazi concentration camp to dance, and a caricature of Adolf Hitler approved the idea, adding that "if they are relaxed, you get a better soap". Sergio Widder, director for Latin America office of the Simon Wiesenthal Center, said: "This so-called parody is beyond offensive. As a newspaper that has been a champion for human rights and fight against racism since its foundation, we expect the editors of Página 12 to immediately and publicly apologize for this distortion of history. Página 12 'Young Culture' section would better serve its youthful readers by teaching them the importance of preserving the memory of the Nazi genocide through remembrance, education and prevention of human rights violations". The newspaper issued an apology afterwards.

In July 2017, Aerolíneas Argentinas ceased distribution of the Página 12 newspapers on their planes. They argued that the newspaper had a debt on the payment for this distribution since the previous year. ADEPA voiced their concern, and asked both parts to find a satisfactory solution. The newspaper was critical of President Mauricio Macri.

Kirchnerism returned to power in 2019, with the election of Alberto Fernández. A common Kirchnerite explanation for the ongoing crisis is that the IMF loan received during the 2018 Argentine monetary crisis was used to finance an illegal capital flight performed by friends of Mauricio Macri. Verbitsky wrote a report in 2020 to support it, detailing the Argentine people that bought the most US dollars during the presidency of Mauricio Macri. Journalist Carlos Pagni dismissed the report, pointing that it confuses legal and illegal capital flight, and that most acquisitions of dollars listed in it were completely legal. He also noted that former president Cristina Kirchner was absent from the list, although she detailed a large bought in her autobiography Sinceramente, that would place her at the 91º position.

Awards
In 2007, Casa América Catalunya, directed by the governments of Spain, Barcelona and Catalunya, gave Página 12 his annual prize for Freedom of expression for its "rigor and professionalism". placed at the service of justice and human rights" through hands of Spaniard musician Joan Manuel Serrat who said: "I think we are in this situation that often occurs in which those of us who participate knows perfectly what is happening, which is so important that it fills us with pride and is part of our memory, but outsiders don't really know. We must transmit this to others, transmitting what is Página 12, what these journalists of Argentina have done, those who made Página 12 possible and made other newspapers and publications possible, sometimes at risk of his own life"

References

External links

Online edition
Rosario 12

1987 establishments in Argentina
Daily newspapers published in Argentina
Spanish-language newspapers
Newspapers established in 1987
Mass media in Buenos Aires
Argentine news websites